Alon or ALON may refer to:

 Alon (name), an Israeli given name and surname
 Alon, Mateh Binyamin, an Israeli settlement in the West Bank
 Alon Inc, an American airplane builder, known for the Alon A-4
 Alon USA, an American energy company
 Aluminium oxynitride (AlON), known under the trade name ALON

See also
 Elon (disambiguation)
 Aloni (disambiguation)
 Aion (disambiguation)

he:אלון (פירושונים)